The Presbyterian Church in Japan is a conservative Reformed denomination in Japan, founded by American missionaries in the mid-1900s.

History 
In the years after World War II, Japanese missionaries and the forerunner of the Presbyterian Church in America evangelists created what is today the  Presbyterian Church in Japan.

The denomination was a result of two Presbyterian denominations in Japan. The Christian Presbyterian Church in Japan founded in 1956 and the Evangelical Presbyterian Church in Japan founded in 1979 begun collaborating in 1980, and united in 1993. The Independent Board for Presbyterian Foreign Missions of planted some churches after the Second World War, and helped establish a Seminary. This become the Evangelical Presbyterian Church in Japan. When the PCA merged with the Reformed Presbyterian Church, Evangelical Synod the missionaries begun assist the PCJ.

The church had 50 congregations and 2,000 members in 3 Presbyteries in 2004. The Westminster Confession of Faith is the official confession.

As of 2013 the denomination is present in 13 Prefectures, in Ibaraki Prefecture, Saitama Prefecture, Chiba Prefecture, Tokyo Prefecture, Kanagawa, Yamanashi Prefecture, Aichi Prefecture, Gifu Prefecture, Mie Prefecture, Ishikawa Prefecture, Osaka Prefecture, Kagawa Prefecture, Miyagi Prefecture, Tokushima Prefecture.

There are church planting movements in several Japanese cities, including Nagoya, Chiba, Osaka and Tokyo.

Theology 
Westminster Confession of Faith
Westminster Shorter Catechism
Westminster Larger Catechism

Seminary 
The church maintains theological training two institutes:
Christ Bible Institute 
Christ Bible Seminary.

Statistics 
The Presbyterian Church in Japan has now 6 Presbyteries and 2,200 regularly worshiping members in 67 congregations. The six Presbyteries are Tokyo, Central, Western, Dongguan Higashikana, Musashi and Kanagawa Presbyteries. The church is among the few Christian denominations that are growing in Japan.
While other missions are shrinking, the PCA mission of the Japanese Presbyterian Church is growing rapidly.
The PCA supports the Christ Bible Institute and the Church planting Institute.
The Presbyterian Church in America supports short-term missionaries for over 27 years.

Partner churches 
Partner churches are the Presbyterian Church in America and the Presbyterian Church of Australia, these denominations aim to plant churches and form Presbytery in Chiba Prefecture. In 1989 3 pastors in the Presbyterian Church in Japan invited the PCA missionaries to serve in Japan to build a Presbytery. The Presbyterian Church in Japan is among the few denominations that are growing in the country.

The church maintains close relationships also with the Orthodox Presbyterian Church (USA) and the Presbyterian Church in Korea (Koshin).

References

External links 

Oyumino Christ Church
map of PCJ churches
Nagoya Church Planting

Presbyterian denominations in Asia
Presbyterianism in Japan
Christian organizations established in 1993
Reformed denominations in Japan
Christian evangelical denominations in Japan